Yohanes Kandaimu (born 12 August 1995) is an Indonesian professional footballer who plays as a centre-back for Liga 1 club Persita Tangerang.

Club career

Persita Tangerang
He was signed for Persita Tangerang to play in Liga 1 in the 2022 season. Kandaimu made his league debut on 25 July 2022 in a match against Persik Kediri at the Indomilk Arena, Tangerang.

Career statistics

Club

Notes

References

External links
 Yohanes Kandaimu at Soccerway
 Yohanes Kandaimu at Liga Indonesia

1995 births
Living people
Papuan people
Sportspeople from Papua
Indonesian footballers
Liga 2 (Indonesia) players
Liga 1 (Indonesia) players
PSG Pati players
PSBS Biak Numfor players
Persita Tangerang players
Association football defenders